Shunting inhibition, also known as divisive inhibition, is a form of postsynaptic potential inhibition that can be represented mathematically as reducing the excitatory potential by division, rather than linear subtraction. The term "shunting" is used because of the synaptic conductance short-circuit currents that are generated at adjacent excitatory synapses. If a shunting inhibitory synapse is activated, the input resistance is reduced locally. The amplitude of subsequent excitatory postsynaptic potential (EPSP) is reduced by this, in accordance with Ohm's Law. This simple scenario arises if the inhibitory synaptic reversal potential is identical to the resting potential.

Discovery 
Shunting inhibition was discovered by Fatt and Katz in 1953.

Mechanism 
Shunting inhibition is theorized to be a type of gain control mechanism, regulating the responses of neurons. Simple inhibition such as hyperpolarization has a subtractive effect on the depolarization caused by concurrent excitation, whereas shunting inhibition can in some cases account for a divisive effect.

Some evidence exists that shunting inhibition can have a divisive effect on neuronal responses, at least on subthreshold postsynaptic potentials. In a 2005 article, researchers Abbott and Chance state that "Although the importance of gain modulation and multiplicative interaction in general has been appreciated for many years, it has proven difficult to uncover a realistic biophysical mechanism by which it can occur. It is important to note that, despite comments in the literature to the contrary (see above), divisive inhibition of neuronal responses cannot arise from shunting inhibition. This has been shown theoretically as well as experimentally – inhibition has the same subtractive effect on firing rates whether it is of the shunting or hyperpolarizing variety." Thus, shunting inhibition does not provide a plausible mechanism for neuronal gain modulation.

See also 
Synaptic depression

References 

Neurophysiology